= Dellacoma =

Australian metal rock band

- Origin: Melbourne, Australia
- Genre: Hard Rock music
- Years active: 2014–present
- Label: XMusic (2024–present)
- Website: dellacoma.com

Dellacoma are an Australian hard rock band from Melbourne, Australia, and based on the Sunshine Coast. They formed in 2014.

In November 2025, they released their third studio album Searching for You in the Darkness which debuted at number 28 on the ARIA Charts.

== Career ==
In mid-2014, lead vocalist and namesake, Dellacoma Rio formed Dellacoma. Prior to this Rio had previously fronted the band Sunset Riot.

In September 2015, they released their debut album, South of Everything.

In 2021, the group released the album, Blood.

In 2024, it was confirmed the group had signed with XMusic.

In July 2025 the group performed at the prestigious US rock festival "Rockfest" in Cadott Wisconsin alongside Five Finger Death Punch, Nothing More, Rob Zombie, Bad Omens, Marilyn Manson and Three Days Grace.

In August 2025 the band performed at Pol'and' Rock Festival in Czaplinek Poland in front of over 250,000 fans

In November 2025 the group released Searching for You in the Darkness. The album was preceded by the singles "Heroes", "More Than Survival" and "I Got You".

== Discography ==
=== Studio albums ===
List of studio albums, with selected details and peak chart positions
Title	Details	Peak chart positions
Title	Details	AUS
South of Everything	Released: September 2015; Format: CD, digital download; Label: Dellacoma, Shock (DR001CD)	—
Blood	Released: July 2021; Format: CD, LP, digital download; Label: Curtain Call Records	—
Searching for You in the Darkness	Released: 28 November 2025; Format: LP, digital download; Label: Dellacoma (DELLACOMA02-2)	28

=== Extended plays ===
List of EPs, with selected details and peak chart positions
Title	Details
Leave a Light On EP	Released: February 2025; Format: digital; Label: XMusic
